Carlos A. Asuaje (born November 2, 1991) is a Venezuelan professional baseball infielder who is a free agent. He previously played for the San Diego Padres of Major League Baseball (MLB) and the Lotte Giants of the KBO League.

Amateur career
A native of Barquisimeto, Venezuela, Asuaje attended St. Thomas Aquinas High School and played college baseball at Nova Southeastern University in Broward County, Florida. Asuaje posted a .356/.451/.519 slash line in three seasons at Nova, being named Sunshine State Conference Freshman of the Year in 2011 and Sunshine State Conference Co-Player of the Year in 2012. After his freshman season in 2012, he played collegiate summer baseball for the Yarmouth–Dennis Red Sox of the Cape Cod Baseball League, where he batted .298 in 52 games, and was named to the East Division All-Star team. Asuaje was selected by the Boston Red Sox in the 11th round of the 2013 MLB draft, and came to terms on a contract calling for a reported bonus of $100,000.

Professional career

Boston Red Sox

He debuted professionally with the Short-Season A Lowell Spinners in their 2013 season, starting his career as a shortstop, but eventually moved full-time to third base where his skills profiled best. He also showed the ability to play second base or left field and spent some time at designated hitter. In just 52 games for Lowell, he hit .269/.366/.368 with 19 runs scored and 20 RBI.

In 2014, Asuaje hit for a .305 average in 90 games for the Low A Greenville Drive, driving in 73 runs and scoring 69 times, while boasting a .391 OBP and collecting 45 extra-base hits. Batting 11 home runs, 10 triples and 24 doubles, he topped the South Atlantic League with a .542 slugging percentage and made the All-Star team before joining the High A Salem Red Sox on July 14.

At Salem, Asuaje reached base safely in 35 of his 39 games against the more advanced High-A Carolina League pitching. He showed a progressive approach with an 11-game hitting streak from August 14–25, 2014, to finish the year with a .323/.398/.516 line, four home runs and 28 RBI. Overall, Asuaje hit .310 and slugged .533 in 129 games in his two stints. Additionally, he was the only player in the Sox minors system to collect 100-or-more RBI (101) and went on to post the best slugging percentage (.533). He also ended fourth in homers (15) and OBP (.393) and 10th in batting average (.310), while his on-base plus slugging (.927) was surpassed only by Mookie Betts (.960). Besides, Asuaje was named Greenville Drive Player of the Year and added another All-Star selection to his list of accomplishments, as he was chosen to the 2014 South Atlantic League Annual All-Star team.

Asuaje was promoted to the Double A Portland Sea Dogs in 2015, where was one of five Sea Dogs selected for the Eastern League All-Star team. Asuaje ended 2015 with eight homers, seven triples, 23 doubles, 61 RBI, 60 runs scored and nine steals, as he slashed .251/.334/.374 over 131 games. He also gained a spot in the Arizona Fall League as a member of the Scottsdale Scorpions during offseason.

San Diego Padres
The Padres acquired Asuaje along with Javier Guerra, Manuel Margot and Logan Allen in November 2015, in the same transaction that sent Craig Kimbrel to the Boston Red Sox.

Asuaje opened 2016 with the Triple-A El Paso Chihuahuas of the Pacific Coast League as the regular second-baseman. He played in the 2016 All-Star Futures Game in his future home stadium, Petco Park, on July 10, then the Triple-A All-Star Game three days later and 2,079 miles away at BB&T Ballpark in Charlotte, North Carolina. He won the 2016 PCL Rookie of the Year Award, leading the league in hits (172) and runs (98), along with top-10 totals in doubles (32), triples (11), total bases (253), batting average (.321) and on-base percentage (.378).

The Padres promoted Asuaje to the major leagues on September 21, 2016, once the Triple-A team ended their playoff run. He made six starts at second base for the Padres as they finished out the season.

Asuaje opened the 2017 season in Triple-A, where he batted .250 in 62 games. After a brief call-up in May, he joined the Padres again on June 23 to become the primary second-baseman after Yangervis Solarte went to the disabled list with an oblique strain. Asuaje continued to man the second-base position even after Solarte's return, as manager Andy Green said Asuaje had "played beyond my expectations".  Asuaje finished the season with a .270/.334/.362 batting line in 307 at-bats with 78 starts at second base.

The following season, Asuaje struggled offensively, hitting .196 in 79 games. He had the lowest batting average against left-handers among all MLB hitters (60 or more plate appearances), at .111. On December 7. 2018, the Padres designated Asuaje for assignment.

Texas Rangers
On December 10, 2018, Asuaje was claimed off waivers by the Texas Rangers.

Lotte Giants
On December 19, 2018, Asuaje was sold by the Texas Rangers to the Lotte Giants of the KBO League. Asuaje was released on June 9.

Arizona Diamondbacks
On June 19, 2019, Asuaje signed a minor league deal with the Arizona Diamondbacks. He elected free agency on November 7, 2019.

Chicago Cubs
On January 6, 2020, Asuaje signed a minor league deal with the Chicago Cubs. Asuaje was released by the Cubs organization on May 28, 2020.

Los Angeles Dodgers
On December 10, 2020, Asuaje signed a minor league contract with the Los Angeles Dodgers organization. In 83 games for the Triple-A Oklahoma City Dodgers, he batted .249. He elected free agency on November 7, 2021.

See also
 List of Major League Baseball players from Venezuela

References

External links

1991 births
Living people
El Paso Chihuahuas players
Greenville Drive players
KBO League infielders
Leones del Escogido players
Venezuelan expatriate baseball players in the Dominican Republic
Lotte Giants players
Lowell Spinners players
Major League Baseball players from Venezuela
Major League Baseball second basemen
Nova Southeastern Sharks baseball players
Portland Sea Dogs players
Reno Aces players
Salem Red Sox players
San Diego Padres players
Scottsdale Scorpions players
Sportspeople from Barquisimeto
Asuaje, Carlos
Venezuelan expatriate baseball players in the United States
Venezuelan expatriate baseball players in South Korea
Yarmouth–Dennis Red Sox players
Oklahoma City Dodgers players